Álex Rins Navarro (born 8 December 1995) is a Spanish Grand Prix motorcycle racer for the LCR Honda Castrol in the MotoGP class. He was the 2011 CEV Buckler 125 Junior GP Champion, and made his Grand Prix motorcycle racing debut in the Moto3 World Championship during the  season.

Career

Moto3 World Championship 
Born in Barcelona, Rins began his career in Moto3 with the Estrella Galicia 0,0 team. In his second meeting, Rins took pole position for the Spanish Grand Prix. He took his first podium in France, with third place. He scored no further podiums, but was very consistent throughout the remainder of the season, regularly finishing in the top ten. He finished fifth in the final standings and became the rookie of the year.

He continued racing for Estrella Galicia 0,0 alongside Álex Márquez in 2013, which would prove to be his breakthrough year. Maverick Viñales, Luis Salom and Rins dominated the season, with Rins scoring 6 wins, 14 podiums and 8 poles, and was in the running for the title throughout the season, finishing second to Viñales by a margin of 12 points.

He continued to race for Estrella Galicia 0,0 in 2014. The 2014 season saw a dip in Rins' performance with 2 wins, 8 podiums and 4 poles which was lesser than his previous years' performance. Ultimately Rins finished the season in third place in the riders' championship.

Moto2 World Championship

Paginas Amarillas HP 40 (2015–2016) 
Rins moved to Moto2 for 2015 with the Paginas Amarillas HP 40 team riding a Kalex. He sported the racing number 40, for the team's sponsorship purposes. In a season dominated by Johann Zarco, Rins achieved 2 wins and 10 podiums, ultimately finishing second in the final standings and winning the rookie of the year.

Rins stayed with the Paginas Amarillas HP 40 team for 2016. The season began well for Rins, achieving wins in Austin and Le Mans and 7 podiums. However, a late season slump coupled with a surge in performance from Thomas Lüthi resulted in Rins finishing the season in third place.

MotoGP World Championship

Team Suzuki Ecstar (2017–2022) 
Rins moved up to the MotoGP class for the 2017 season with Team Suzuki Ecstar alongside his new teammate, Andrea Iannone, and changed his number back from 40 to 42.
The first half of his season was hampered when he broke his wrist during practice at Texas in April, and didn't return to the bike until two months later at Assen. However, his fortunes took an upturn with a season-best fifth place in the wet in Japan, bettered with a fourth-place finish at the final round in Valencia.

An improved Suzuki machine coupled with a lack of injuries allowed Rins to be a consistent podium contender in 2018. Despite a disappointing start to the season with 5 retirements in 9 races, Rins amassed 5 podiums (including second place in both of the final two rounds) and a total of 169 points, finishing the season in 5th place of the rider's championship and 36 points ahead of his teammate Iannone.

On 17 May 2018, ahead of the French GP, Rins was confirmed to have signed a two-year extension with Suzuki, guaranteeing his factory rider position with the Hamamatsu manufacturer through 2020.

For the 2019 season, Rins was paired with MotoGP rookie and 2017 Moto3 champion Joan Mir. After finishing just outside of the podium in both the Qatar and Argentine round, Rins won the 2019 Grand Prix of the Americas whilst dueling with Valentino Rossi after the retirement of Marc Márquez. It is his first win in the MotoGP class and Suzuki's first win since Maverick Viñales won the 2016 British Grand Prix as well as their 2nd premiere class win since their return to MotoGP. Rins finished the season with 205 points which got him the 4th place in the championship, his best MotoGP season finish to date.

LCR Honda Castrol (from 2023) 
On 19 July 2022, Rins signed a two-year deal with LCR Honda starting in 2023.

Career statistics

CEV Buckler 125GP Championship

Races by year 
(key)

Grand Prix motorcycle racing

By season

By class

Races by year 
(key) (Races in bold indicate pole position, races in italics indicate fastest lap)

References

External links 

 

1995 births
Living people
Spanish motorcycle racers
Motorcycle racers from Catalonia
Moto3 World Championship riders
Moto2 World Championship riders
Suzuki MotoGP riders
MotoGP World Championship riders
Sportspeople from Barcelona